The  was held on 9 February 1986 in Yokohama Nikkatsu Theatre, Yokohama, Kanagawa, Japan.

Awards
 Best Film: Love Hotel
 Best Actor: Minori Terada – Love Hotel
 Best Actress: Tomoyo Harada – Early Spring Story
 Best New Actress:
Noriko Hayami – Love Hotel
Yuka Ōnishi – Typhoon Club
 Best Supporting Actor: Tomokazu Miura – Typhoon Club
 Best Supporting Actress: Kie Nakai – Kanashii kibun de joke
 Best Director: Shinji Sōmai – Love Hotel, Typhoon Club
 Best Screenplay: Takashi Ishii – Love Hotel, Muhan
 Best Cinematography: Noboru Shinoda – Love Hotel
 Best Music Score:  Shigeru Umebayashi – Sorekara, Tomo yo Shizukani Nemure
 Best Independent Film: Keppū Rock
 Special Prize:
Mitsuko Baisho (Career)
Tatsumi Kumashiro (Career)

Best 10
 Love Hotel
 Typhoon Club
 W's Tragedy
 Lonely Heart
 Early Spring Story
 Sorekara
 Tomo yo Shizukani Nemure
 Ikiteruuchi ga Hanananoyo Shindara Soremadeyo Tō Sengen
 Minna Agechau
 Night on the Galactic Railroad
 runner-up. You Gotta Chance
 runner-up. Fire Festival

References

Yokohama Film Festival
Yokohama Film Festival
Yokohama Film Festival
Yokohama Film Festival